Start from the Dark is the sixth studio album by the Swedish rock band Europe. It was released on 22 September 2004 by Sanctuary Records. It was the band's first release since reforming in 2003, the first original album of all-new material since 1991's Prisoners in Paradise, and the first album to feature the band's original guitarist John Norum since 1986's The Final Countdown.

Start from the Dark departs from the glam metal genre and featured a more modern sound compared to Europe's first two albums. "We wanted to be doing something at least that was a little bit relevant now; bit of a dry mix, detuned a bit," vocalist Joey Tempest said, "So we felt like we didn't want to do an '80s album per se, we just wanted to start like a fresh band really." Eventually, the album sold in excess of 600,000 copies worldwide.

Track listing

Band 
Joey Tempest – vocals, acoustic guitars
John Norum – guitars
John Levén – bass
Mic Michaeli – keyboards
Ian Haugland – drums

Others 
Marcus Michaeli – additional beats
Europe – Producer
Kevin Elson – Producer, Mixing
Tom Size – Engineer
Bob Ludwig – Mastering
Niklas Bernstone – Photography
Niklas Brodd – Art Direction and Graphic Production
Thomas Larsson – Art Direction and Graphic Production

Chart positions

References 

Europe (band) albums
2004 albums
Sanctuary Records albums
Albums produced by Kevin Elson